The 1996 Men's Floorball Championships were the first men's Floorball World Championships. It was held in May 1996 in Sweden, and was won by the host nation. The 1996 World Floorball Championships were the first in IFF history.

Championship results

Preliminary round

Group A 
Venue: Skellefteå, Sweden

Group B 
Venue: Uppsala, Sweden

Placement round

11th Place match

9th Place match

7th Place match

5th Place match

Final round

Semifinals

Bronze Medal match

Championship match

Leading scorers

All-Star team
Goalkeeper:  Stefan Mattsson
Defense:     Jari-Pekka Lehtonen,  Jonas Eriksson
Forward:     Christian Hellström,  Andrea Engel,  Martin Olofsson

Official 1996 Rankings according to the IFF

External links 
Tournament Statistics
final game report at SVT's open archive 

Mens World Floorball Championships, 1996
Floorball
Men's World Floorball Championships
Floorball World Championships
1990s in Stockholm
International sports competitions in Stockholm
Men's World Floorball Championships
Sports competitions in Skellefteå
Sports competitions in Uppsala